Dave Wright may refer to:

 Dave Wright (baseball) (1875–1946), American baseball pitcher
 Dave Wright (footballer) (1905–1955), Scottish footballer
 Dave Wright (politician) (born 1945), member of the Tennessee House of Representatives
 Dave Wright (runner) (born 1951), South African ultramarathon runner
 Dave Wright (writer) (born 1985), American poet, writer, and publisher
 Dave Wright (badminton) (born 1965), English badminton player

See also 
 David Wright (disambiguation)